The Holly and the Ivy is a 1952 British drama film directed by George More O'Ferrall and starring Ralph Richardson, Celia Johnson, and Margaret Leighton with Denholm Elliott, John Gregson and Hugh Williams also in the cast. It was adapted from the 1950 play of the same name by Wynyard Browne. Produced by Anatole de Grunwald and co-scripted by Browne and de Grunwald it was distributed by British Lion Films. It is about an Irish clergyman whose neglect of his grown offspring, in his zeal to tend to his parishioners, comes to the surface at a Christmas family gathering.

The film was shot at Shepperton Studios outside London with sets designed by the art director Vincent Korda. Actresses Margaret Halstan and Maureen Delany reprised their roles from the stage. It was released in the United States in 1954 by the independent Pacemaker Pictures.

Plot
It is traditional for the widespread Gregory family to return home for Christmas at the parsonage in the remote village of Wyndenham in rural Norfolk. The film opens with introductions of each of member of the family save for younger, fashionista daughter Margaret (Margaret Leighton), who is for much of the first half an unseen character. The plot centres on the situation of Jenny (Celia Johnson), who is housekeeper for her aged parent Martin (Ralph Richardson). He is the village parson and apparently cares much more about his parishioners than his family. Jenny wishes to marry engineer David (John Gregson), who is bound for South America for five years, but she cannot leave her father unless her sister or one of her aunts agrees to look after Martin.

Tensions arise after the family assembles. The catalyst is Martin's son Michael (Denholm Elliott), who has developed strong resentment towards religion and his father's plans to send him to university after he has completed his national service in the Royal Artillery. Margaret arrives late and makes clear to Jenny that she has no intention of staying or of giving up her life as a magazine writer in London. It soon transpires that Margaret is becoming alcoholic and, in separate discussions with Jenny and Michael, she reveals that she has been an unmarried mother but that her four-year-old son has recently died of meningitis, driving her into her present reliance on alcohol. The underlying problem facing all three siblings is that they cannot approach their father about anything unconventional, as they believe him to be uptightly religious and more likely to disapprove of their respective situations than to show kindness and understanding.

Regardless of their father's perceived feelings, Margaret and Michael decide they do not want to be with him and their two aunts on Christmas Eve and go out, ostensibly to the cinema. In fact, Margaret wants to go to the pub and they both end up drunk which results in a scene when they return to the house. On Christmas morning, Margaret announces that she is leaving immediately and Michael argues with Martin to the point of questioning the existence of God. Margaret has also become an atheist.

It emerges that Martin is not a tyrannical parent or judgmentally religious after all. He is very understanding of their problems because he has helped people with similar issues throughout his career and even wrestled with similar ones on the way to discovering his religious vocation. In individual heart-to-hearts with Michael and Margaret just before the Christmas morning service, he also expresses his regret and disappointment that they consider him unapproachable. All is thus resolved, with Michael relenting over university and Margaret agreeing to turn her back on the London life she secretly hates to live with Martin, which will allow Jenny to marry David and go to South America. The entire family is in harmony at church as the morning service begins.

Cast
 Ralph Richardson as Reverend Martin Gregory
 Celia Johnson as Jenny Gregory
 Margaret Leighton as Margaret Gregory
 Denholm Elliott as Gunner Michael Gregory
 John Gregson as David Paterson
 Hugh Williams as Lt. Col. Richard Wyndham
 Margaret Halstan as Aunt Lydia
 Maureen Delany as Aunt Bridget
 William Hartnell as Company Sergeant Major
 Robert Flemyng as Major
 Roland Culver as Lord B.
 Dandy Nichols as Neighbour

Reception
According to the November 2009 Moviemail Catalogue, "Russian screen writer Anatole de Grunwald imbues this poignant adaptation of Wynward Browne's West End stage hit with Chekhov's spirit and relocates the Russian's genius for deftly-drawn characters to a rambling Norfolk parsonage on Christmas Eve. [...] while The Holly and The Ivy now radiates a nostalgic glow, it is actually a revealing record of a country on the cusp of the dramatic social, economic and cultural change that has, sadly, made faith, fidelity and family feel like relics of a distant past."

See also
 List of Christmas films

References

External links 
 
 
 

1952 films
1952 drama films
1950s Christmas films
1950s Christmas drama films
British black-and-white films
British Christmas drama films
British films based on plays
Films about alcoholism
Films about dysfunctional families
Films about religion
Films directed by George More O'Ferrall
Films produced by Anatole de Grunwald
Films scored by Malcolm Arnold
Films set in Norfolk
Films shot at Shepperton Studios
Films with screenplays by Anatole de Grunwald
London Films films
1950s English-language films
1950s British films